Mi marido tiene familia is a Mexican comedy telenovela that premiered on Las Estrellas on June 5, 2017. Produced for Televisa by Juan Osorio and Roy Rojas and created by Héctor Forero López and Pablo Ferrer García-Travesí, based on the South Korean series My Husband Got a Family written by Park Ji-eun and produced by KBS.

On October 18, 2017, Juan Osorio confirmed that the show had been renewed for a second season.

Series overview

Episodes

Season 1 (2017)

Season 2: Mi marido tiene más familia (2018)

Special

References 

Lists of soap opera episodes
Lists of Mexican drama television series episodes